Admiral Beaumont may refer to:

Alan Beaumont (1934–2004), Royal Australian Navy admiral
Basil Beaumont (1669–1703), British Royal Navy rear admiral
John Beaumont, 4th Baron Beaumont (1361–1396), English admiral
Lewis Beaumont (1847–1922), British Royal Navy admiral